Vexitomina metcalfei is a species of sea snail, a marine gastropod mollusk in the family Horaiclavidae.

Description
The length of the shell attains 20 mm.

The holotype is a faded shell in the British Museum. This species varies in size, colour, and sculpture. It reaches a length of 20 mm., with nineteen tubercules on the penultimate whorl, and is usually dark chestnut picked out with buff on the shoulder nodules. The operculum is unguiculate with a terminal nucleus.

Distribution
This marine species is endemic to Australia and occurs off New South Wales and Queensland.

References

 Angas, G.F. 1867. Descriptions of thirty-two new species of marine shells from the coast of New South Wales. Proceedings of the Zoological Society of London 1867: 110–117, pl. 13 
 Smith, E.A. 1879. On a Collection of Mollusca from Japan. Proceedings of the Zoological Society of London 1879: 181–218, pls 18-20
  Hedley, C. 1922. A revision of the Australian Turridae. Records of the Australian Museum 13(6): 213-359, pls 42-56
 Powell, A.W.B. 1942. The New Zealand Recent and fossil Mollusca of the family Turridae with general notes on turrid nomenclature and systematics. Bulletin of the Auckland Institute and Museum. Auckland, New Zealand 2: 2188
 Laseron, C. 1954. Revision of the New South Wales Turridae (Mollusca). Australian Zoological Handbook. Sydney : Royal Zoological Society of New South Wales 1-56, pls 1–12.
 Powell, A.W.B. 1968. The Turrid shellfish of Australian waters. Australian Natural History 1 16: 1-6 
 Powell, A.W.B. 1969. The family Turridae in the Indo-Pacific. Part. 2. The subfamily Turriculinae. Indo-Pacific Mollusca 2(10): 207–415, pls 188-324 
 Wilson, B. 1994. Australian Marine Shells. Prosobranch Gastropods. Kallaroo, WA : Odyssey Publishing Vol. 2 370 pp.

External links
 
  Tucker, J.K. 2004 Catalog of recent and fossil turrids (Mollusca: Gastropoda). Zootaxa 682:1-1295

metcalfei
Gastropods of Australia